This is a list of condo hotels  located in the United States.

900 North Michigan
Aqua
Bridgman's View Tower
Conrad Fort Lauderdale
Cosmopolitan of Las Vegas
Edison Condominiums
EPIC Miami Residences and Hotel
Four Seasons Hotel Denver
Four Seasons Hotel Miami
Hotel Valley Ho
L.A. Live
Mandarin Oriental - Atlanta, Georgia
Mandeville Place
Old Chicago Main Post Office Twin Towers
Park Tower - Chicago, Illinois
Plaza Hotel
Residences at Mandarin Oriental
The Residences Providence
Ritz-Carlton Denver
The Signature at MGM Grand
Soleil Center
South Station Tower
Three PNC Plaza
Trump Hotel Las Vegas
Trump International Hotel and Tower - Chicago, Illinois
Trump International Hotel and Tower - Honolulu, Hawaii
Trump International Hotel and Tower - New Orleans, Louisiana
Trump International Hotel and Tower - New York City, New York
Trump SoHo
Victory Tower
W Boston Hotel and Residences
W New York Downtown Hotel and Residences
Waldorf Astoria Chicago
Waldorf-Astoria Hotel and Residence Tower
Wanda Vista
Water Tower Place
Westin Book Cadillac Hotel
Wolf Point South Tower

See also
 List of condominiums in the United States
 List of condo hotels in Canada

hotels
Condo